Between 20 November 1945 and 1 October 1946, the International Military Tribunal (IMT) tried 24 of the most important political and military leaders of Nazi Germany. Most of the defendants had surrendered to the United States Army, but the Soviet Union also held a few top Nazis who were extradited for trial at Nuremberg. The defendants included some of the most famous Nazis, including Hermann Göring, Rudolf Hess, Joachim von Ribbentrop, and Wilhelm Keitel. Also represented were some leaders of the German economy, such as Gustav Krupp (of the conglomerate Krupp AG) and former Reichsbank president Hjalmar Schacht.

They were indicted for:
 Participation in a common plan or conspiracy for the accomplishment of a crime against peace
 Planning, initiating and waging wars of aggression and other crimes against peace
 Participating in war crimes
 Crimes against humanity
The 24 accused were, with respect to each charge, either indicted but not convicted (I), indicted and found guilty (G), or not charged (—), as listed below by defendant, charge, and eventual outcome:

References

Citations

Avalon Project
These citations refer to documents at 

International Military Tribunal in Nuremberg
Nazi-related lists
Lists of German people